Can You Hear Me Now? may refer to:

 Can You Hear Me Now, an album by Sawyer Brown, or the title song
 "Can You Hear Me Now?" (CSI: NY), an episode of CSI: NY
 "Can You Hear Me Now?" (Pretty Little Liars), an episode of Pretty Little Liars
 "Can you hear me now?", a line from a series of television advertisements for Verizon Wireless by actor Paul Marcarelli